Prince Cheng of the Second Rank, or simply Prince Cheng, was the title of a princely peerage used in China during the Manchu-led Qing dynasty (1644–1912). As the Prince Cheng peerage was not awarded "iron-cap" status, this meant that each successive bearer of the title would normally start off with a title downgraded by one rank vis-à-vis that held by his predecessor. However, the title would generally not be downgraded to any lower than a feng'en fuguo gong except under special circumstances.

The first bearer of the title was Yunzhi (1677–1732), the third son of the Kangxi Emperor. In 1698, Yunzhi was granted the title "Prince Cheng of the Second Rank" by his father. The title was passed down over eight generations and held by eight persons.

Members of the Prince Cheng peerage

 Yunzhi (1677–1732), the Kangxi Emperor's third son, initially a junwang (second-rank prince), demoted to beile in 1699, promoted to qinwang (first-rank prince) in 1709, demoted to junwang again in 1728, restored as a qinwang briefly in 1730 before being stripped of his title, posthumously restored as a junwang under the title Prince Chengyin of the Second Rank (誠隱郡王)
 Hongsheng (弘晟; 1698–1732), Yunzhi's third son, designated as Yunzhi's shizi (heir apparent) from 1720 to 1724, stripped of his title in 1724
 Hongjing (弘暻; 1703–1777), Yunzhi's seventh son, initially made a feng'en zhenguo gong from 1728 to 1730, held the title of a beizi from 1730 to 1777
 Yongpo (永珀), Hongjing's second son, held the title of a second class fengguo jiangjun from 1749 to 1760, stripped of his title in 1760
 Yongshan (永珊; 1746–1797), Hongjing's third son, held the title of a feng'en zhenguo gong from 1777 to 1797
 Miance (綿策; 1780–1800), Yongshan's third son, held the title of a feng'en fuguo gong from 1797 to 1800, had no male heir
 Honghuang (弘晃; 1713–1749), Yunzhi's tenth son
 Yongheng (永珩; 1739–1778), Honghuang's son
 Miandao (綿道; 1764–1825)
 Yiguo (奕果; 1791–1870), Miandao's second son and Miance's successor, held the title of a buru bafen fuguo gong from 1801 to 1870
 Zailing (載齡; 1812–1883), Yiguo's eldest son, held the title of a buru bafen fuguo gong from 1870 to 1883, had no male heir
 Hongxian (弘暹; 1710–1771), Yunzhi's eighth son
 Yongbian (永玣; 1739–1803), Hongxian's son
 Mianxie (綿爕; 1764–1793), Yongbian's son
 Yongjie (永介; 1741–1793), Hongxian's son
 Mianchao (綿超; 1765–1817), Yongjie' son
 Yiguang (奕光; 1791–1830), Mianchao's son and Mianxie's adopted son
 Zaishuang (載雙; 1836–1878), Yiguang's son
 Puyuan (溥元; 1870–1927), Zaishuang's eldest son and Zailing's successor, held the title of a buru bafen fuguo gong from 1884 to 1927
 Yupeng (毓彭; 1893–?), Puyuan's eldest son, held the title of a buru bafen fuguo gong from 1927 to 1928, stripped of his title in 1928
 Henghai (恆海; 1915–?), Yupeng's son

Family tree

See also
 Royal and noble ranks of the Qing dynasty

References
 

Qing dynasty princely peerages
Peerages of the Bordered Blue Banner